Dharmana Krishna Das  – Deputy Chief Minister of Andhra Pradesh and  minister of Revenue in Y. S. Jaganmohan Reddy's government of Andhra Pradesh, India. He was elected to the legislative assembly from Narasannapeta in the 2019 general elections.

References

Living people
Year of birth missing (living people)
Indian National Congress politicians from Andhra Pradesh
Andhra Pradesh MLAs 2009–2014
People from Srikakulam district
YSR Congress Party politicians
Indian National Congress politicians
Deputy Chief Ministers of Andhra Pradesh
Andhra Pradesh MLAs 2019–2024